Andy Murray defeated John Isner in the final, 6–3, 6–7(4–7), 6–4 to win the singles tennis title at the 2016 Paris Masters. By reaching the final, Murray secured the world No. 1 ranking for the first time in his career.

Novak Djokovic was the three-time defending champion, but lost to Marin Čilić in the quarterfinals.

As a result of Roger Federer's withdrawal from the tournament, he fell outside of the top 10 in the ATP rankings for the first time since 13 May 2002.

Seeds
All seeds receive a bye into the second round.

Draw

Finals

Top half

Section 1

Section 2

Bottom half

Section 3

Section 4

Qualifying

Seeds

Qualifiers

Qualifying draw

First qualifier

Second qualifier

Third qualifier

Fourth qualifier

Fifth qualifier

Sixth qualifier

References

External links
 Main Draw
 Qualifying Draw

Singles